The 1965 LFF Lyga was the 44th season of the LFF Lyga football competition in Lithuania.  It was contested by 16 teams, and Inkaras Kaunas won the championship.

League standings

References
RSSSF

LFF Lyga seasons
1965 in Lithuania
LFF